Dolichoderus vlaskini is an extinct species of ant in the genus Dolichoderus. Described by Dlussky and Perkovsky in 2002, the fossils were discovered in the Rovno amber, located in Ukraine.

References

†
Eocene insects
Prehistoric insects of Europe
Fossil taxa described in 2008
Fossil ant taxa
Rovno amber